Deborah John (born 10 April 1990) is a Trinidad and Tobago hurdler. She competed in the women's 100 metres hurdles at the 2017 World Championships in Athletics.

References

External links

1990 births
Living people
Trinidad and Tobago female hurdlers
World Athletics Championships athletes for Trinidad and Tobago
Place of birth missing (living people)